The Shapsug (also known as the Shapsugh or Shapsogh) are one of the twelve major Circassian tribes. Historically, the Shapsug tribe comprised one of the largest groups of the Black Sea Adyghe (Причерноморские адыги). They inhabited the region between the Dzhubga (in  means "Winds" or "The Valley of Winds") River and the Shakhe Rivers (the so-called Maly Shapsug, or Little Shapsug) and high-altitude mountainous areas of the northern slopes of the Caucasus range along the Antkhir, Abin, Afips, Bakan, Ships, and other rivers (Bolshoy Shapsug, or Greater Shapsug).
In Russia, the remaining Shapsug population mainly live in the Tuapsinsky District (Tuapse) of Krasnodar Krai, Lazarevsky City District of Sochi, and in the Republic of Adygea (mainly in District of Takhtamukaysky and District of Teuchezksky), which were a small part of historical Circassia.

However, today the major Shapsug communities are found in Turkey, Israel (Kfar Kama), Jordan (Amman, Na'our, Marj Al-Hamam, Wadi Al-Seer), Lebanon (Tripoli, Berkayel -Akkar), Iraq, Syria, Western Europe, and the United States of America. The first Circassians to settle in Amman were from the Shapsug tribe, and as a result the Shapsug's neighbourhood is considered the oldest neighbourhood in the Capital Amman and was the down town of it; however, other Circassians from the Kabardian, Abadzekh, and Bzhedug tribes also settled in Amman afterwards. Today, the Shapsug are the third-most numerous Circassian tribe in the world, after the most numerous Kabardian and second-most numerous Abzakh tribes. The Shapsug are the most numerous Circassian tribe in Israel, third-most numerous in Turkey where the majority of them live, and the fifth-most numerous one in Russia. In Jordan, after the Abzakh, the Shapsug and Kabardian tribes are the most numerous Adyghe tribes.

The Shapsug speak a sub-dialect of the Adyghe language. According to some indirect data, there were over four thousand Shapsug in Russia in 1926, but the Shapsug people were not enumerated as a separate group in Russian Censuses until 2002, when the population was recorded at 3,231. The Shapsug who live in the Adyghe Republic  were enumerated as an Adyghe in general instead of Shapsug in particular, as they are an Adyghe (Circassian) tribe, rather than a separate ethnic group.

In District of Takhtamukaysky a reservoir which was built in 1952 was named after the Shapsug tribe since the area was inhabited by this tribe for thousands of years and was considered to be part of historical Shapsugia, a region in historical Circassia.

History

The Shapsug were a very large tribe that occupied extensive territories of the Black Sea coast and the Kuban River. Different sources note that, prior to the Russo-Caucasian War, the number of Shapsug people was between 150,000 and 300,000 people. The Shapsug had divisions of Big and Small Shapsug land, the latter being very close to the Natukhai tribe's land. The Shapsug took an active role in the Caucasian war. They had a reputation of invincibility and were one of the last to lay down their weapons under the pressure of tsarist troops in 1864. Some Shapsug troops fought until the 1880s. After the end of the war the overwhelming majority of the Shapsug were forcefully evicted to Turkey and elsewhere in the Middle East. No more than 6,000 Shapsug people remained on their native land. Presently, these Shapshug live in the territory of Krasnodarsky Krai and make up about 20 villages. From 1924 to 1945, there was a Shapsug National District, which was abolished during the time of repressions .

Historically the Shapsug controlled the ports of Dzhubga and Tuapse to the mountain gorges, and consisted of 5 aristocratic families and 81 free clans. They were classified as one of the three democratic Adyghe tribes. The Shapsug were known to have supported the other Adyghe tribes in their struggle against the Crimean Khanate. During the Caucasian War, they were one of the most stubborn enemies of Imperial Russia, joining Shamil's alliance (which would last until 1859). In late 1860, a council was assembled by the representatives of three Adyghe tribes (Shapsug, Ubykh, and Natukhai). The council considered Sochi to be the last capital of the Circassian resistance. In 1864, a major part of the Shapsug and other Adyghe tribes moved to the Ottoman Empire due to the Russian army occupation of Circassia, as a result of the tsars' regular policy to cleanse the Circassian coast of Circassian people (mainly physically; later by expelling the remaining population to the Ottoman Empire. Some 3,000 Shapsug remained on the Circassian coast.

The Shapsug, as an Adyghe tribe, have always appreciated and honored their "immortals" (heroes and fighters) who sacrificed their lives to keep Circassia independent in the battles and war with the Russian Empire during the Circassian resistance; by elegies such as the Elegy of the Shapsugs

Shapsugsky National District
On 6 September 1924, the Bolsheviks established the Shapsug National Raion ( Šapsyġe Nacionalne Rajon,  Šapsugskij nacional′nyj rajon) as a part of the Black Sea Okrug. The district contained around 3,400 Shapsug people, and the center of the district was the coastal city of Tuapse. In the beginning of 1925, it was divided into 4 village councils: Karpovsky, Kichmai, Krasno-Aleksandrovsky, and Pseushkho. After the end of the Second World War in 1945, the Shapsug National Raion was renamed Lazarevsky District.

In 1990, the first congress of the Shapsug tribe took place, where they would adopt a declaration on the reinstatement of the Shapsug National Raion. On 12 June 1992, the Presidium of the Supreme Soviet of the Russian Federation passed a resolution on the establishment of the Shapsug National Raion.

Culture
The traditional Shapsug culture had much in common with other Circassian tribes. The Shapsug were engaged in agriculture, cattle and horse breeding, horticulture, viticulture, and beekeeping. In pre-Islamic and pre-Christian times, the Shapsug worshiped the Circassian gods—Shible (god of thunder and lightning), Sozeresh (god of fertility), Yemish or Yemij (god of war), Akhin and Khakustash (protectors of cattle breeding), Tlepsh (god of blacksmithing), Keshkogwasha (god of the Black Sea), etc. The Shapsug used to perform the Hantse Guashe ceremony of rain calling during droughts by carrying a dressed doll through the aul and then drowning it in the river, and never getting it out before rain had arrived.

Since the early 19th century, the Shapsug are primarily Sunni Muslims (Hanafi).

Language

The Shapsug is one of the mutually intelligible sub-dialects of the Adyghe language's West Adyghe dialect.
There were two major varieties of Shapsug before the exile of the Circassians. Since the Shapsug scattered around the world, each Shapsug community developed a different form of speech.

Some Shapsug families

Some of the Shapsug families in Jordan

 Kosho
 Pshedatok
 Shhalakhwa
 Psekenop
 Jan
 T’harkakhwa
 Kwiej
 Hadagha
 Meesha
 Hatough
 Naghoj
 Tamokh
 Khorma
 Bghana 
 Naghouj
 Hakuch
which changed in Jordan to Hakouz ( after their 15th great-grandfather Хэкужъ born in 1337 in Tuapse, and this family considered the biggest Shapsug family in Jordan.
 Natkho (Shukri)
 Shawash
 Shoupash

Shapsug families in Kfar Kama, Israel

 Abrag
 Ashmuz/Achmuzh
 Bghana
 Bat
 Blanghaps
 Batwash
 Zazi
 Kobla
 Qal
 Qatizh
 Lauz
 Libai/Labai
 Nago
 Natkho
 Nash
 Napso
 Thawcho
 Gorkhezh
 Hazal
 Hadish
 Hako/Hakho
 Shamsi
 Choshha/Shoshha
 Showgan
 Shaga
 Sagas/Shagash
In the past there was also Shhalakhwa and Kuadzhe.

Notable people
Tirimüjgan Kadın – Mother of Sultan Abdul Hamid II of the Ottoman Empire
Karzeg Sait Bey (1887–1920) 
Çerkes Ethem
Hazret Sovmen
Tuguzhuko Kyzbech
Suna Öz – Mother of Dr Oz
Bibras Natcho
Nili Natkho

See also
 Other Circassian tribes
 Shapsug Adyghe sub-dialect
 Hakuchi Adyghe sub-dialect
 Murayj al-Durr

References

External links
Official site of Shapsugia (Russian/Adyghe)
Famous Circassians
Journal of a residence in Circassia during the years 1837, 1838, and 1839 - Bell, James Stanislaus (English)

 
Adygea
Circassian tribes
History of Kuban
Ethnic groups in Israel
Ethnic groups in Russia
Ethnic groups in Jordan
Ethnic groups in Turkey
Krasnodar Krai